Qi Jiping (born December 5, 1995) is a Chinese baseball pitcher who plays with the Sichuan Dragons in the China Baseball League. 

Qi represented China at the 2017 World Baseball Classic.

References

1995 births
Living people
2017 World Baseball Classic players
Chinese baseball players
Baseball pitchers
Sichuan Dragons players
Baseball players at the 2014 Asian Games
Asian Games competitors for China